Idiocetus ("unique whale") is a genus of extinct cetaceans of the family Balaenidae.

Discovery
Fossils belonging to this genus were first found in Piacenzian (Upper Pliocene) strata near Montopoli in Val d'Arno, a town in Tuscany (central Italy). The Italian paleontologist Giovanni Capellini described the whale in 1876 and attributed it to a new genus and species, establishing the type species Idiocetus guicciardinii. Some decades later, in 1926, other fossil remains possibly belonging to the genus were discovered from the Tortonian (Upper Miocene) of Japan.

References

Further reading
Capellini, G., 1905. "Balene fossili toscane. III. Idiocetus guicciardinii". Memorie della Regia accademia delle Scienze dell’Istituto di Bologna 6: 71–80.

Baleen whales
Miocene cetaceans
Pliocene cetaceans
Prehistoric mammals of Europe
Prehistoric cetacean genera
Fossil taxa described in 1876
Tortonian first appearances
Piacenzian extinctions